Clint Cade Finley (born March 27, 1977) is a former American football Safety who played two seasons for the Kansas City Chiefs.

Early life
Finley was born on March 27, 1977 in Andrews, Texas and attended Cuero High School.

College career
Finley went to college at Nebraska, playing safety. In 1996 he was redshirted. In 1997 he played in 9 games and had 14 tackles. In 1998 he had 28 tackles and had 3 interceptions, one which he returned for a touchdown against Colorado. In 1999 he played in 12 games and had 27 tackles, he also had one interception. He played in 11 games in 2000 and had 22 tackles but no interceptions.

College Awards and Honors
1998 Honorable-Mention Academic All-Big 12
Big 12 Commissioner's Spring Academic Honor Roll (1999)
Big 12 Commissioner's Spring Academic Honor Roll (2001)

Professional career

Dallas Cowboys

Clint was originally signed as an undrafted free agent by the Dallas Cowboys in 2001, but did not make the final roster.

Kansas City Chiefs

On February 20, 2002, Finley was signed by the Kansas City Chiefs. He was released on September 1, 2002. The next day he was signed to the Chiefs practice squad. In 2002 he played in one game and had one tackle. On December 27, he signed a three-year contract. On February 5, he was sent to the Berlin Thunder. After the offseason with the Thunder, he was signed to the practice squad. He was promoted to the active roster two days later. Then, a week later, he was released again. He was signed to the practice squad again two days later. On October 8, he was released from the practice squad. He was signed again on December 10. In 2003 he played in 3 games. He did not make the roster in 2004.

Berlin Thunder

On February 5, 2003, he was sent to the Berlin Thunder of NFL Europe. He played in all ten games that season, recording 57 tackles.

Dallas Cowboys (second stint)

On April 7, 2005 he was signed by the Dallas Cowboys. He was released in June. After being released he did not play another NFL game.

Later life
From 2010 to 2015 Finley served as Athletic Director/Head Football Coach at Los Fresnos CISD. Finley’s team made the playoffs each of those years. He later served as Athletic Director/Head Football Coach at Big Spring ISD. Finley is currently a Corporate Salesman for Performance Chemical Company in Midland, TX.

References

Living people
1977 births
American football defensive backs
Nebraska Cornhuskers football players
Kansas City Chiefs players
Berlin Thunder players
Players of American football from Texas
People from Andrews, Texas